The Southern Division was a New Zealand parliamentary electorate in the Auckland Province from 1853 to 1860. It was a large two-member electorate south of the town of Auckland.

Population centres
The New Zealand Constitution Act 1852, passed by the British government, allowed New Zealand to establish a representative government. The initial 24 New Zealand electorates were defined by Governor George Grey in March 1853. Southern Division was one of the initial two-member electorates.

Southern Division was a large electorate south of Auckland, extending to the southern boundary of the province and encompassing the Waikato, Coromandel, Bay of Plenty and East Cape. It bordered onto the Taranaki electorate , and the 39th parallel south formed the boundary with the Wellington Province, where all land immediately south of this land was not incorporated into any electorate until 1858.

In the 1860 electoral redistribution, the House of Representatives increased the number of representatives by 12, reflecting the immense population growth since the original electorates were established in 1853. The redistribution created 15 additional electorates with between one and three members.

History
Three candidates were nominated, and the show of hands was declared to be in favour of Major Gray and Captain Powditch. Charles John Taylor demanded a poll, which was held one week later on Tuesday, 23 August 1853. Taylor received the highest number of votes, Gray came a close second, and Powditch as the third placed candidate was not elected.

Theodore Haultain contested a by-election on 8 May 1858 and was elected. He represented the electorate until the end of the term in 1860, when he was defeated for the Raglan electorate.

Members of Parliament

Key

Election results

1858 by-election

1853 election

 
 
 

Table footnotes:

Notes

References

Historical electorates of New Zealand
1853 establishments in New Zealand
1860 disestablishments in New Zealand